Kaiser Aluminum Corporation is an American aluminum producer. It is a spinoff from Kaiser Aluminum and Chemicals Corporation, which came to be when common stock was offered in Permanente Metals Corporation and Permanente Metals Corporation's name was changed to Kaiser Aluminum and Chemicals Corporation.

History 

Founded in 1946, Henry J. Kaiser's corporation entered the aluminum business by leasing, then purchasing three government-owned aluminum facilities in Washington state. These were the primary reduction plants at Mead and Tacoma, and the rolling mill at Trentwood. The company grew to be a vertically integrated aluminum producer.

Kaiser Aluminum previously owned a subsidiary that developed real estate, including in Rancho California, California; Oregon, Washington, and Arizona. In 1986, Kaiser Aluminum sold the bulk of the $450 million dollar real estate holdings to an investor group led by Peter B. Bedford.

In 1988, Charles Hurwitz and his company Maxxam, Inc. purchased KaiserTech Ltd, the Oakland-based parent of Kaiser Aluminum and Chemical Company. Kaiser Aluminum filed for bankruptcy in 2002, due to labor disputes, the West Coast energy crisis, and asbestos liabilities. The steel workers union was suspicious of Hurwitz on the collapse of the Kaiser Aluminum Corporation and closely watched his 1995 FDIC lawsuit because Hurwitz has a history of loss-plagued businesses.

The company emerged from bankruptcy four years later. In March 2006, Kaiser Aluminum determined to restate its financial statements for the quarters ended March 31, 2005; June 30, 2005; and September 30, 2005, to adjust its VEBA-related payments and derivative financial instrument transactions.

The company previously owned a stake in Anglesey Aluminium, a joint venture with Rio Tinto Group. The smelter at this facility was closed in 2009, and the entire facility was fully closed in 2013.

In April 2021, Kaiser Aluminum completed acquisition of Alcoa Warrick, LLC, renaming it Kaiser Warrick, LLC. Kaiser entered into a long term ground lease with Alcoa; Alcoa retains its on site four unit coal fired generating station, smelting assets, and land assets with the remainder of the facility to be operated by Kaiser. Presently, Kaiser Aluminum Warrick operates a cast house, hot mill, cold mills, finishing mills/coating lines, and slitter lines, producing flat rolled aluminum sheet for the food and beverage container market. In July 2021, Kaiser Aluminum announced plans to construct an additional roll coating line at Kaiser Aluminum Warrick, at a cost of approximately $150 Million dollars. Construction of this line is expected to begin by the first half of 2022, and achieve initial operational capability by 2024.

About 
Kaiser Aluminum is headquartered in Franklin, Tennessee. With the acquisition of the former Alcoa Warrick, LLC (now Kaiser Warrick, LLC), Kaiser Aluminum now employs approximately 3,700 persons.

References

External links 
 

 
1946 establishments in Washington (state)
Companies based in Tennessee
Companies listed on the Nasdaq
Henry J. Kaiser
Non-renewable resource companies established in 1946
Companies that filed for Chapter 11 bankruptcy in 2002